War paint is paint ritually applied to the face and/or body prior to going into a battle.
War Paint or Warpaint may also refer to:

Music
 Warpaint (band), an American indie rock band from Los Angeles
Warpaint (Warpaint album), 2014 album by Warpaint
"Warpaint", song by Warpaint from The Fool (2010)

Albums
 Warpaint (The Black Crowes album) (2008)
 War Paint (The Dangerous Summer album), or the title song (2011)
 War Paint (Lorrie Morgan album), or the title song (1994)
 Warpaint (Happy Rhodes album), or the title song (1991)

Songs
 "War Paint" (Fletcher song) (2015)
 "War Paint" (Madeline Merlo song) (2016)
 "War Paint", by Gwen Stefani from This Is What the Truth Feels Like (2016)
 "Warpaint", by Ivory Hours (2015)
 "War Paint", by Kelly Clarkson from Piece by Piece (2015)
 "War Paint", by Rush from Presto (1989)
 "War Paint" , by Jonah Marais

Films
 War Paint (1926 film), a western by W. S. Van Dyke
 War Paint (1953 film), a western starring Robert Stack and Joan Taylor
 Iliza Shlesinger: War Paint, a 2013 stand-up comedy film

Other uses
War Paint (horse), (c. 1945) a ProRodeo Hall of Fame bucking horse
 Warpaint (mascot), a mascot of the Kansas City Chiefs NFL team
 War Paint (musical), a Broadway musical based on the rivalry between Elizabeth Arden and Helena Rubinstein
 Luxilus coccogenis or warpaint shiner
 War Paint, a Disney comic by Carl Barks
 Military camouflage